The 1860 Great Meteor procession occurred on July 20, 1860. It was a unique meteoric phenomenon reported from locations across the United States. American landscape painter Frederic Church saw and painted a spectacular string of fireball meteors cross the Catskill evening sky, an extremely rare Earth-grazing meteor procession. It is believed that this was the event referred to in the poem Year of Meteors, 1859-60, by Walt Whitman. In 2010, 150 years later, it was determined to be an Earth-grazing meteor procession.

See also 

 1783 Great Meteor
 1913 Great Meteor Procession
 1972 Great Daylight Fireball

References 

Meteoroids
1860 in science
1860 in the United States
18600720
Modern Earth impact events
Earth-grazing fireballs
July 1860 events